BOND (Building Object Network Databases) started development in late 2000 as a rapid application development tool for the GNOME Desktop by Treshna Enterprises. Its aim was to fill a gap that traditional Microsoft Windows applications like Borland Delphi, Microsoft Access and Visual Basic filled on the Windows desktop, but targeted for the Linux environment. Its goal was to allow developers to quickly build database forms in XML for backend SQL databases. It has been employed extensively by Treshna Enterprises to develop applications such as PayMaster (an opensource payroll application) and GymMaster (a commercial gym management application).

Description 
It uses PostgreSQL as its backend database and GTK+ as its front end. Windows and HTML driven front ends are also available. While it initially worked closely with Glade and the Gnome Desktop, newer versions have focused on more web oriented with AJAX driven widgets. The Glade XML format was abandoned a number of years ago and a new XML schema was developed to be more flexible with the range of data required for storing database information. BOND makes use of BONDDB which serves as a layer between the BOND API and the PostgreSQL backend. 

In the future, BOND aims to be a free open source solution that allows users to quickly create their own databases from scratch without being a skilled programmer or DBA.

External links 
 BOND development website

GNOME
Software that uses GTK